Gurpreet Singh  (born 31 August 1984) is an Indian footballer who currently plays for Churchill Brothers S.C. in I-League as a defender.

Honours

India U20
 South Asian Games Silver medal: 2004

References
 Goal.com profile

Indian footballers
1984 births
Living people
Salgaocar FC players
Churchill Brothers FC Goa players
Chennai City FC players
Footballers from Punjab, India
Association football defenders
India youth international footballers
South Asian Games silver medalists for India
South Asian Games medalists in football